The 34th Academy of Country Music Awards was held on May 5, 1999, at the Universal Amphitheatre, in Los Angeles, California . The ceremony was not hosted by anyone.

Winners and nominees 
Winners are shown in bold.

References 

Academy of Country Music Awards
1999 in American music
Academy of Country Music Awards
Academy of Country Music Awards
Academy of Country Music Awards
Academy of Country Music Awards